Vank (Armenian: Վանք) is a village in the Syunik Province of Armenia.

References 

Populated places in Syunik Province